Main Course, released in 1975 for the RSO Records label, is the 13th album by the Bee Gees, and their last album to be released by Atlantic Records in the US under its distribution deal with Robert Stigwood. This album marked a great change  for the Bee Gees as it was their first album to include mostly R&B, soul and funk-influenced songs, and created the model for their output through the rest of the 1970s. It rejuvenated the group's career and public image, particularly in the US, after the commercial disappointment of their preceding few albums. It was the group's thirteenth album (eleventh worldwide). Main Course was the first album to feature keyboardist Blue Weaver. The album cover with the band's new logo designed by US artist Drew Struzan made its first appearance here.

Background
Working with Atlantic producer Arif Mardin, who had also produced their previous album, Mr. Natural, and engineer Karl Richardson at Criteria Studios in Miami, their music became much more influenced by Funk sound over a base of R&B style being produced in Miami at the time. Main Course also featured the first prominent use of Barry Gibb's falsetto. From Mr. Natural, the brothers retained new drummer Dennis Bryon and longtime lead guitarist Alan Kendall but added a new keyboard player in the form of Bryon's former Amen Corner colleague Blue Weaver who would become one of only a small handful of non-Gibb musicians to receive composition credits on Bee Gees songs. At the suggestion of Eric Clapton, the Bee Gees moved to Criteria Studios in Miami, to start recording their next album. Barry recalled Clapton's suggestion when he was trying to make a comeback: "Eric said, 'I've just made an album called 461 Ocean Boulevard in Miami. Why don't you guys go to America and do the same and maybe the change of environment will do something for you?' I think it was really good advice."

Maurice Gibb, on the other hand, cites their manager Robert Stigwood as the first to suggest Miami as the best place to record new songs. "He [Robert] showed us the picture on the cover [of 461 Ocean Boulevard] and said, 'You can rent that place and live there and record and get a sun tan.' We decided that it was our big chance to get serious about our music again so we went out there and did Main Course."

Recording
According to producer Arif Mardin, when the Bee Gees arrived in Florida, they started to record new material and some of the numbers were still in their old ballad style, and the Bee Gees at that time were listening to a lot of American R&B groups' songs as Mardin is an R&B producer. Mardin also suggested they listen to current R&B artists including Stevie Wonder.

The sound became more technologically current with the use of synthesizers and dual bass lines (synthesizer bass by Blue Weaver and bass guitar by Maurice Gibb) on many of the songs, which came about after Weaver overdubbed a synthesizer bass line on the original demo of "Jive Talkin'."  Weaver later commented that "nothing new has been invented to make such a tremendous difference to the sound as the synthesizer did, compared to an orchestra."

At first, the brothers were still writing in their old ways, with many of the songs being slower ballads. The first song recorded for the album was an unreleased track "Was It All in Vain?". The next songs recorded were "Country Lanes" and "Wind of Change". After Robert Stigwood heard these songs, he urged them to record in a more R&B style and "Wind of Change" was re-recorded again in February in its more familiar version. Another unreleased track, "Your Love Will Save the World" was recorded on 9 January, though it was later recorded by Percy Sledge. Once the Gibb brothers changed their style of writing, songs like "Jive Talkin'", "Nights on Broadway" and "Edge of the Universe" were recorded with an R&B influence, though ballads like "Songbird" and "Come on Over" were more country than R&B. The final song recorded for the album was "Baby As You Turn Away" which featured Barry singing the verses in falsetto, though not the strong falsetto which he would develop and use on future songs like "You Should Be Dancing" and "Stayin' Alive".

Release

The album peaked at No. 14 on the US Billboard album chart in 1975 and remained on Billboard's Top 200 albums chart for 74 weeks until December 1976 on the strength of its three singles that charted on Billboard'''s single chart: "Fanny (Be Tender with My Love)" at No. 12, "Nights on Broadway" at No. 7, and "Jive Talkin'" at No. 1. A live version of a fourth song, "Edge of the Universe" from the album Here at Last... Bee Gees... Live'', reached No. 26.  "Come on Over" later became a moderate hit (#23) in a cover version by country/pop artist Olivia Newton-John. The album also peaked No. 1 at the Canada's RPM Albums Chart.

Track listing

Personnel

Bee Gees
Barry Gibb – lead, harmony and backing vocals, rhythm guitar
Robin Gibb – lead, harmony and backing vocals
Maurice Gibb – bass guitar, lead and rhythm guitars, harmony and backing vocals

Bee Gees band
Alan Kendall – lead guitar, steel guitar
Dennis Bryon – drums, percussion
Blue Weaver – keyboards

Additional musicians and production
Joe Farrell – tenor saxophone
Don Brooks – harmonica
Ray Barretto – congas
Strings conducted by Gene Orloff
Produced and arranged by Arif Mardin
Engineered by Karl Richardson and Lew Hahn

Charts

Weekly charts

Year-end charts

Certifications and sales

References

Bee Gees albums
1975 albums
Albums arranged by Arif Mardin
Albums produced by Arif Mardin
RSO Records albums
Albums with cover art by Drew Struzan